Ludwig Ramberg (21 February 1874 – 25 December 1940) was the Swedish chemist who discovered in 1940 the Ramberg-Bäcklund reaction, together with his student Birger Bäcklund (2 May 1908 – 21 January 1997).

Life
Ramberg was born in the Swedish city of Helsingborg and studied at the University of Lund, where he received his Ph.D in 1902. He stayed in Lund until 1918 when he became professor at the University of Uppsala. He retired in 1939 and died in Uppsala 1940.

References

1874 births
1940 deaths
Swedish chemists